Morioka (written: 森岡 or 守岡) is a Japanese surname. Notable people with the surname include:

, Japanese boxer
, Japanese swimmer
, Japanese anime director and artist
, Japanese writer
, Peruvian-born Japanese futsal player
, Japanese musician
, Japanese racewalker
, Japanese philosopher
, Japanese politician
, Japanese footballer
, Japanese baseball player
, Japanese footballer
, Japanese footballer
Zak Morioka (born 1978), Brazilian racing driver

Japanese-language surnames